Events during the year 2022 in Italy.

Incumbents 
President: Sergio Mattarella
Prime Minister: Mario Draghi (until 22 October), Giorgia Meloni (from 22 October)

Events 
Ongoing – COVID-19 pandemic in Italy
Ongoing – Protests over COVID-19 policies in Italy

January  
 1 January: Despite the public ban on not using New Year's barrels throughout Italy there were 14 seriously injured after the use of unauthorized fires.
 3 January: A 40 year old woman drowns her son in the sea in Torre del Greco.
 8 January: The Scala dei Turchi monument in Agrigento (Realmonte) is vandalized.
 Serie A announces a closure of football stadiums that have a capacity of over 5,000 due to the spread of the Omicron variant.
 13 January: The tenth anniversary of the sinking of the Costa Concordia in which 32 people died.
 15 January: In Turin a man kills a little girl by knocking her off a balcony during a game.
 16 January: In Naples there is a boom in electric bike sales in a single day 15 thousand models are sold.
 17 January: Following the spread of the omicron variant, the Aosta Balley passed into the orange zone.
 An egalitarian marriage committee is created to speed up the approval process for same sex marriage in Italy.
 Naples appears to be the city that pays more attention to animals, 10 out of 9 stray dogs find a home.
 19 January: A man from Viareggio suffering from psychological disorders barricades himself at home with his elderly father, will be arrested for attempted murder of a firefighter.
 interior minister Luciana Lamorgese signs a security pact against crime and gomorrah in Naples.
 20 January: a family from Syria and with serious physical problems will be taken to Italy where they will live in Siena and will be cared for by caritas.
 the royal palace of Caserta celebrates 270 years of construction.
 21 January: Work begins on the construction of the new Salerno airport which will be completed by 2024.
 the historic Japanese cartoon Tiger Mask turns 40 years after its arrival in Italy.
 the European court of human rights condemns Italy for having separated a mother from her daughter in the city of Brescia.
 22 January: Silvio Berlusconi withdraws his candidacy a few days before the elections for the president of the republic.
 in Taranto a man injures 2 officers who were chasing his car.
 in Italy there is yet another death at work, it is an 18-year-old boy who worked as an intern in Udine.
 23 people are arrested between Apulia and Calabria for participating in an international drug dealing from Turkey and the Netherlands.
 Starbucks closes its stores in Milan, however the US chain announces that it has great news for Italy.
 A few dozen people protest in Milan against vaccines and green passes.
 23 January: in Brescia (Rezzato) there is a terrible accident between a car and a bus 5 young people die.
 According to a survey, Milan is the most expensive city in Italy, spending 47% more than Naples. Naples, Palermo and Pescara are the cheapest cities.
 24 January: 2022 Italian presidential election
 following the spread of COVID-19 (omicron variant) the health minister Roberto Speranza has decided to sign an ordinance that puts Piedmont, Sicily and Friuli in the orange zone, while Apulia and Sardinia go yellow.
 26 January: in Livorno a twelve-year-old is beaten and laughed at by a group of boys for being Jews, a fact that has upset even the white Patrizio Bianchi minister of education.
 IPTV broadcasters were searched in the regions of Calabria, Campania, Emilia-Romagna and Tuscany, allowing free viewing of Sky channels, DAZN and films.
 The financial police confiscate 50 smartphones and shut down an illegal service where Sky's paid service was broadcast completely free of charge.
 28 January: in Ostia, a girl denounces her parents to the carabinieri following Islamic extremism against her by her family.
 29 January: Sergio Mattarella is reelecdted as [President of Italy|President] for a second term.
 30 January: a fire in an apartment in Reggio Emilia kills 2 children.

February  
 1–5 February: The Sanremo Music Festival 2022 takes place in Sanremo.
 1 February: Russian President Vladimir Putin telephones Prime Minister Mario Draghi for reassurance on gas supplies for Italy.
 In the city of Agrigento a policeman kills his son with a service pistol.
 In Cagliari a newborn is hit by a hijacker in front of his mother, the man shows up at the barracks and is sentenced.
 2 February: In Rome a group of activists vandalized the headquarters of the ministry of ecological transition.
 In Grumo Nevano, Naples, a man strangles a 23-year-old woman to death, the man is arrested.
 3 February: Sergio Mattarella is sworn in as President of Italy, starting his second term.
 5 February: Milan is classified as a big European city, with a total of 20 skyscrapers.
 US broadcaster CBS broadcasts the Inter-Milan derby in order to promote football in the United States. The match was broadcast live from San Siro.
 8 February: Carabinieri control a Rom camp in Giugliano, Naples, finding ultra-light aircraft engines stolen the night before.
 In Como an elderly woman who died 2 years earlier is found sitting on a chair in a complete state of decomposition, the woman is found by the police who had been called for investigations.
 9 February: Following an investigation into corruption in Salerno, 5 people are arrested including the PM Roberto Penna.
 11 February: Mount Etna erupts during the night.
 15 February: A man from Rome finds a ticket, alleged to be from an African slave in China, in a COVID-19 mask, however, there is no evidence of the ticket's accuracy.
18 February: In Turin during a demonstration on the safety of young people on internships, a group of students attacks the confindustria using eggs against the police, seven injured are recorded.
 A ship between Italy and Greece is damaged by a fire.
19 February: Protestors mainly consisting of university students and activists protest the Green Pass in Milan.
 24 February: Prime Minister Mario Draghi and Foreign Minister Luigi Di Maio condemn Russia following its invasion of Ukraine.
 27 February: Following the Russia-Ukraine crisis, Mario Draghi announces that Italy aligns itself with the harsh sanctions of the European Union against Russia.
 The Italian government closes its airspace to Russian planes.
 28 February: The first Ukrainian refugees arrive in Italy mostly direct by bus to Trieste, Milan, Rome and Naples.
 The Italian government sends weapons and equipment to Ukraine whilst Italian soldiers are positioned in Romania alongside other NATO forces.

March  
 1 March: Mario Draghi announces the reopening of the coal factories due to the ongoing gas crisis.
 The 40th anniversary of the first broadcast of Lady Oscar is commemorated  
 The Italian embassy in Ukraine is moved from Kyiv to Lviv due to security reasons.
 5 March: A demonstration against the war in Ukraine is held in Rome with over 50,000 people taking part, however some people demonstrate against NATO.
 6 March: the police seize villas, yachts and luxury goods from the Russian oligarchs present in Italy following the economic sanctions imposed on Russia after the invasion of Ukraine.
 7 March: Due to the Russian invasion of Ukraine, the prices of wheat and gasoline rise throughout Italy and Europe. 
 12 March: Foreign Minister Luigi di Maio visits Angola and the Republic of the Congo to find new agreements on gas supplies in Italy.
 16 March: In Vicenza, a 25-year-old man kills his parents to steal their money and investments.
 Schools in Somma Vesuviana, Naples, welcome Ukrainian children who have escaped from the war.
 17 March: The 161st Anniversary of Italian unification is commemorated.
 24 March: The Italy national team remains out of the FIFA World Cup for the second consecutive time after Russia 2018. losing 1-0 in the playoff match against North Macedonia in Palermo.
 29 March: Mario Draghi visits the city of Naples where he is met with protestors demonstrating against unemployment and COVID-19 vaccinations 
30 March: Mario Draghi and Russian President Vladimir Putin discuss peace in Ukraine.
 31 March: The state of emergency related to the on COVID-19 pandemic officially ends.
 A storm in Palermo causes damage to buildings in the city.

April  
 1 April: A bill that would legalize same-sex marriage in Italy is presented for the first time in the Senate.
 After a year the parliamentary commission closes the Denise Pipitone case, ending with no progress.
 3 April: Bari Calcio returns to Serie B after 5 years.
 5 April: Thirteen earthquakes are recorded in the Phlegraean fields.
 11 April: after the sentence of 23 December, Catania Calcio was expelled from the Serie C championship, declaring total bankruptcy.
 16 April: Mario Draghi and Maio's foreign minister travel to Angola for an agreement on the import of gas.
 17 April: An attack in Piazza San Carlo near the Diego Armando Maradona stadium in Naples kills a 25-year-old man.
 numerous attacks take place in Trieste and Trento, a 14-year-old boy is seriously injured by a stab.
 18 April: during the Napoli-Roma football match, 91 cars are seized, 135 reports are made and 27 squatters are surprised.
 21 April: foreign minister Luigi Di Maio signs an agreement for gas supplies to italy with the Republic of Congo.
 24 April: for the first time in the history of Italian football, a team from Trentino Alto Adige lands in Serie B Is Südtirol.
 Modena F.C returns to Serie B.
 25 April: Liberation Day
 A brawl between baby gangs in Naples, the problem of baby gangs grows in the main Italian cities, including Naples and Milan.
 Crotone Calcio definitively collapses after having excited between Serie A and Serie B returns to Serie C 13 years later.
 27 April: the Nola caritas welcomed around 120 Ukrainians who fled the war.
 During the celebration of April 25, the secretary of the PD Enrico Letta is harshly contested by a group of the extreme left that calls for the exit of Italy from NATO.
 28 April: a 60-year-old bartender from Pesaro is sentenced to 3 years in prison for pedophilia on a child.
 Football prosecutor Mino Raiola is hospitalized urgently for a lung disease, rumors about his death begin to circulate and are immediately denied.
 30 April: the cassation canceled the acquittal of Simone Pillon after 6 years the senator of the lega will return to trial for homophobic discrimination.
 according to a former Russian minister, Russia is preparing an attack on the NATO countries and a target to hit would be in Aviano (Pordenone).
 After 2 days of speculation, the death of Mino Raiola is officially announced by the prosecutor's family.

May 
1 May: the government removes major restrictions against covid except masks.
 some owners of a fishmonger are attacked by a bunch of boys, while they were opening the fishmonger in Naples.
 Russian Foreign Minister Lavrov threatens Italy to be in the front row against Russia.
 2 May: The Roman group Måneskin join the spotify Billions club.
 4 May: A woman from Macerata is brutally beaten by her husband after discovering her divorce intentions after discovering she is a lesbian.
 Postal police and Save the Children recommend greater attention to online games, as pedophile victims have risen to 47% across Italy.
 In Somma Vesuviana car thefts occur, the carabinieri arrest 2 people.
 5 May: In Milan, a 90-year-old woman is robbed by thieves who had promoted to help her with an ATM.
 Roma becomes the first Italian team to reach the UEFA Conference League final.
 6 May: Cremonese returns to Serie A after 26 years.
 Lecce returns to Serie A after 2 Years.
 7 May: Dimitri Roveri, a provincial footballer of the Mantova 1911 team, dies on the pitch following a cardiac arrest.
 The dead body of a boy is found in Milan.
 a Labrador dog farm in the city of Sessa Aurunca is closed as illegal.
 8 May: A man from Somma Vesuviana manages to escape from a robbery attempt while thieves shoot his car at him.
 In the city of Alessandria a lesbian woman is beaten and sent to the emergency room.
 San Donato Tavarnelle arrives in Serie C for the first time. Its promotion confirms the best period of the provincial teams since 2010.
 10–14 May: Eurovision Song Contest 2022 is held in Turin, and won by Ukrainian folk rap group Kalush Orchestra with the song Stefania.
 10 May: A drug dealer from Rome escapes on a scooter after being chased by the police, the man will be arrested inside a McDonald's.
 11 May: 2021–22 Coppa Italia final Inter-Juventus. Inter win 2-4 
 13 May: Milan becomes the first city in Italy to use the QR Code in restaurants that allows you to pay the bill without waiting.
 14 May: in a retirement home in San Vitaliano (Naples) gave expired drugs to the elderly.
 The Filadelfia Stadium in Turin is reopened.
 15 May: 2 boys are stabbed while walking in the maritime area of Naples.
 After 15 years of Serie A, Genoa were relegated to Serie B.
 16 May: Rome is put on red alert zone for swine fever spread because of boars.
 In the town of Brusciano (Naples) are arrested 17 representatives from groups linked to gomorra.
 17 May: Milan proclaims area of freedom for LGBT people, without proper legal procedures also it recognizes the sex change of trans people.
 20 May: monkeypox arrives in Italy.
 22 May: Milan wins Serie A after 11 years.
 Salernitana becomes the first team not to be relegated to Serie B with 31 points.
 23 May: 30 years after the Capaci massacre where the anti-mafia judge Giovanni Falcone was killed.
 first hospitalization for monkeypox in Arezzo.
 24 May: The police seize an orange truck containing drugs in Turin, the 2 drivers are arrested.
 The first positive cases of monkeypox in Lombardy.
 29 May: a shooting takes place in the city of Qualiano (Naples).
 30 May: In a school in Bergamo, a cylinder explodes and 5 children are burned.
 2 sisters are scarred with acid in Naples.

June  
 3 June: The first municipality to approve the gender register is Milan.
 10 June: The case of Chievo Verona which could return to Serie B is reopened.
 18 June: In Catania, an 11-year-old girl is killed by her mother.
 21 June: The political party Movimento 5 stelle splits following the farewell of Luigi Di Maio who will form a new party, the rift should not trigger a government crisis according to experts.
 23–24 June: Written test of the final exams.
 27 June: After the Caserta pride, homophobic writings and homophobic attacks were recorded.

July 
 3 July: 2022 Marmolada serac collapse
 3–6 July: Olympics of the real Neapolitan pizza.
 8 July: A storm strikes Naples, creating a lot of inconvenience and damage even in the provinces.
 Teramo Calcio and Campobasso Calcio are excluded from Serie C 2022-23.
 11 July: First convictions for the attacks on the CGIL in the autumn, all Forza Nuova participants are sentenced to 6 years in prison, except the 2 leaders who are sentenced to house arrest.
 13 July: In Lecce, the gender register for Trans and non-binary people is approved, it is the second Italian municipality to do so.
 The Catania football team is re-founded and will restart from Serie D.
 14 July: the 2022 Italian government crisis of the Draghi Cabinet begins.
 16 July: The West Nile virus returns to Italy, the first cases in Veneto and Emilia Romagna, one death registered.
 20 July: The senate votes for 95 of the senators in favor of the trust in Mario Draghi who is rejected.
 21 July: Prime Minister Mario Draghi announces his resignation while President Sergio Mattarella dissolves the chambers and establishes new elections.

August 
 9 August: Domino's Pizza announces it is pulling out of the Italian market after seven years.

September 
 6 September: the case of Angela Celentano reopens.
 9 September: Controversial on the cartoon peppa pig for a lesbian couple by Brothers Of Italy, the episode was also broadcast by RAI.
 15–16 September: 2022 Marche flood
 25 September: 2022 Italian general election

 26 September: The students of the Manzoni high school in Milan occupy the building in protest against Meloni's victory.

October  
 13 October: Ignazio La Russa becomes the President of the Senate of the Republic. He is the first politician with a neo-fascist background to hold the position of President of the Senate, the second highest-ranking office of the Italian Republic.
 14 October: Ultraconservative Lorenzo Fontana becomes the President of the Chamber of Deputies since 14 October 2022.
 19 October: Volleyball player Paola Egonu decides to leave the Italian national team after various racist insults.
 20 October: In Naples, the NAS close the pizzeria that invented the pizza Margherita (in 1889) due to poor cleaning.
 The Salerno police and the financial police arrest a drug dealer who was selling drugs on the seafront.
 21 October: Giorgia Meloni receives the task of forming a new government from President Sergio Mattarella, She become first female prime minister in Italian history.
 An illegal immigrant from the Gambia who had been selling drugs for six years in Salerno is arrested and repatriated.
 Six people are put under house arrest after stealing fish from Salerno markets.
 22 October: The Meloni Cabinet becomes operational. It was variously described as a shift to the political right, as well as the first far-right-led coalition in Italy since World War II.
 27 October: A man stabs five people including the Monza Calcio player Pablo Marì in the city of Assago (Milan).
 27–29 October: The 100th year anniversary of the March on Rome. 
 Thousands of supporters of Benito Mussolini parade.

November 
 16 November: Italy is officially a candidate to host Euro 2032
 26 November: 2022 Ischia landslide

December 
 7 December: in Verona 13 people from groups linked to the fascist extreme right attack a group of Moroccan families who were celebrating Morocco's victory over Spain with sticks and iron chains. 
 22 December: Denise Pipitone case, Former prosecutor Maria Angioni is arrested for making false claims about the investigation to find the girl who disappeared 18 years ago.

References

 
Italy
Italy
2020s in Italy
Years of the 21st century in Italy